Montserrat María Brugué Inurritegui (b. 4 March 1967), more widely known as Monserrat Brugué or Monchi, is a Peruvian actress with more than 30 years of experience in the art world, covering work in television, cinema, and theatre. She is most known for her role as Monchi in the Peruvian TV show .

Biography
Brugué made her debut in acting in 1984 when she appeared in the Peruvian telenovela  as its villain, Monchi, a name that come to define her career. Later, she joined the theater group Telba and began studying acting with Alberto Ísola. Brugué reprised the role of Monchi be for the television show El Santo Convento on América Televisión. The character would also appear in the 2015 comedy film .

Brugué came in fifth place on the Peruvian dance reality show Bailando por un Sueño, hosted by Gisela Valcárcel, after three months of competition.

In 2008, she moved her family to Cusco to work as a theater teacher, but would return to Lima to act in a production of August: Osage County.

In 2016, Brugué returned to her role as Monchi for a YouTube series set in the universe of Patacláun called Los Planes De Ricky, or Ricky's Plans, aimed at educating children of sound financial practices. Funded by the Peruvian Bank of Credit, the show broke 3,000,000 views.

Credits

Television
1985:  as Monchi.
1992: La Perricholi
1993: Las Mujeres de mi vida
1996: Travesuras con Monchi, Presented.
1997-1999:  as Monchi.
2003:  as Madrina.
2007: Perú Campeón as Sofía.
2007-2008: El santo convento as Monchi (Patacláun).
2008: Bailando por un Sueño, Contestant, placed fifth.
2014: Conversando con la Luna as Mamá.
2016: Los Planes De Ricky as Monchi (Patacláun).
2017:  as Paloma Terranova.
2017:  as Cucha.

Films
2001: Bala Perdida as Giovanna
2004: Doble Juego as Reina
2015:  as an additional tertiary character and Monchi

Theater
1993: Pataclaun en la ciudad
1994: Pataclaun en...Rollado
1996: Pataclaun busca pareja
1997: El juicio final
2000: Pataclaun en...Venta
2002: Othello
2003: Princesa Cero
2005: Manzanas para recordar
2006: El círculo de arena
2007: Pinoccio
2008: Morir de amor
2008: The Feast of the Goat
2009: Una gran comedia Romana
2010: Cocina y zona de servicio (as Martina)
2010: August: Osage County (as Elí)
2013: Rosa de dos aromas (as Marlene)
2013: Sombras (as Mother)
2013: El círculo de arena
2014: Japón (as Ventura)

Citations

1967 births
Actresses from Lima
Peruvian television actresses
Peruvian stage actresses
Peruvian film actresses
Living people